The Black Swan class and Modified Black Swan class were two classes of sloop of the Royal Navy and Royal Indian Navy.  Twelve Black Swans were launched between 1939 and 1943, including four for the Royal Indian Navy; twenty-five Modified Black Swans were launched between 1942 and 1945, including two for the Royal Indian Navy; several other ships were cancelled.

History
Like corvettes, sloops of that period were specialised convoy-defence vessels. Corvettes were based on a mercantile design with triple expansion engines, sloops were conventional naval vessels with turbines.  Sloops were larger and faster with a heavy armament of high angle 4-inch guns which had superior anti-aircraft fire control via the Fuze Keeping Clock, while retaining excellent anti-submarine capability. They were designed to have a longer range than a destroyer at the expense of a lower top speed, while remaining capable of outrunning surfaced Type VII and Type IX U-boats.

In World War II, Black Swan-class sloops sank 29 U-boats. The most famous sloop commander was Captain Frederic John Walker. His sloop  became one of the most successful submarine hunters, taking part in the sinking of eleven U-boats. After the war, sloops continued in service with the Royal Navy, Egyptian Navy, Indian Navy, Pakistan Navy and the West German Navy. In April 1949,  was attacked on the Yangtze River by the Communist People's Liberation Army. Several Black Swan sloops fought in the Korean War.

Black Swan class

Royal Navy
The first two ships were built under the 1937 Programme, being ordered from Yarrow and Company, Scotstoun, on 1 January 1938. The second pair was built under the 1939 Programme, being ordered from Furness Shipbuilding Company on 21 June 1939. A further ten RN ships were ordered under the 1940 War Programme on 13 April 1940; however six of these (the orders placed with White of Cowes, Thornycroft at Woolston, and Swan Hunter on Tyneside for two ships each) were subsequently replaced by orders for an equal number of  escort destroyers.

There were incremental improvements as the building developed, and the Woodcock and Wren when completed were practically indistinguishable from the Modified Black Swan class.

Royal Indian Navy
Two ships were ordered under the 1939 Programme, the order being placed with Denny on 8 September 1939. The second pair were ordered under the 1940 Programme, this order with Thornycroft being placed on 29 August 1940. The first two were used as survey ships after the War. The second pair were transferred to the Pakistan Navy in 1948. The third pair (which were of the Modified Black Swan class – see below)

Modified Black Swan class

Royal Navy
Fourteen sloops for the RN were in the 1940 Supplementary War Programme. The first two were ordered from Denny, Dunbarton, on 9 January 1941, ten more were ordered on 27 March 1941 (two each from Cammell Laird, Scotts, Thornycroft, Yarrow and John Brown), and a final pair from Fairfield, Govan, on 18 July 1941. The contract with John Brown was transferred to Devonport Dockyard on 3 March 1942, and then to Denny on 8 December 1942.

Another fourteen ships were authorised in the 1941 Programme, but the last three ships (the names Star, Steady and Trial had been approved) were not ordered under this programme. The first of the eleven actually ordered was contracted with Thornycroft on 3 December 1941, with a further pair from Stephens, Linthouse, on 18 December. Eight more were ordered in 1942, two on 11 February, two on 3 March (originally from Portsmouth Dockyard), two on 12 August and two on 5 October. However the order for two sloops were ordered at Portsmouth was moved to Chatham Dockyard on 21 June 1943, and they were laid down there, but were cancelled on 15 October 1945.

Two more sloops were authorised in the 1942 Programme; the names would have been Waterhen and Wryneck but they were never ordered in that year's Programme. The 1944 Programme re-instated these two vessels, as well as the twelfth sloop authorised under the 1941 Programme, and now named as Partridge. These three ships were ordered on 9 October 1944, but they were all cancelled on 15 October 1945. Two further ships planned under the 1944 Programme would have been named Woodpecker (ii) and Wild Swan, but these were never ordered and the intention to build was dropped when the 1945 Programme was compiled.

, ordered from Thornycroft.
, ordered from Denny.
, ordered from Denny.

Royal Indian Navy
Two ships for the Indian Navy were included in the 1941 Programme, the order being placed with Yarrow on 10 September 1941.

Losses
In World War II
 was sunk by Italian torpedo bombers off Algiers on 10 November 1942
 was seriously damaged by an acoustic homing torpedo fired by U-256 on 20 February 1944 whilst escorting convoy ON-224. The ship sank a week later on 27 February whilst under tow during an Atlantic storm.
 was sunk by U-344 on 21 August 1944 whilst the ship was escorting aircraft carriers covering the Arctic convoy JW 59.
 was damaged beyond repair by U-968 on 17 February 1945
 was sunk by U-968 on 20 March 1945 just outside Murmansk, USSR.

U-boat kills
U-198 was sunk near the Seychelles by the frigate  and HMIS Godavari on 12 August 1944.

Reassessment
The British Admiralty withdrew this credit in a post-war reassessment in the 1990s.

See also
List of ship classes of World War II
Black Swan-class sloop (2012)

References

Bibliography

External links

 
Ship classes of the Royal Navy
Sloop classes